Events in the year 1973 in Turkey.

Parliament
 14th Parliament of Turkey (up to 14 October)
 15th Parliament of Turkey

Incumbents
President 
 Cevdet Sunay (up tp 28 March 1973)
Fahri Korutürk (from 8 April 1972)
Prime Minister:
 Ferit Melen (up to 15 April 1973)
Naim Talu (from 15 April 1973)

Cabinet
35th government of Turkey (up to 15 April 1973)
36th government of Turkey (from 15 April 1973)

Events
 28 January – Turkish consuls Mehmet Baydar and Bahadır Demir assassinated by an Armenian terrorist.
 3 March – Republican Party merges with Reliance Party to become Republican Reliance Party.
 6 April – Fahri Korutürk elected as Turkish president.
 27 May – Galatasaray wins the championship.
 14 October – Republican People's Party (CHP) wins the general elections with plurality.
 30 October – Bosphorus Bridge opens.
 25 December – İsmet İnönü dies.

Births
10 May – Rüştü Reçber, goalkeeper
14 June – Halil Mutlu, weightlifter
16 June – Balçiçek İlter, journalist
27 August – Burak Kut, singer
31 October – Arzum Onan actress
12 November – Alper Celen, entrepreneur

Deaths
27 January – Turkish consuls Mehmet Baydar and Bahadır Demir assassinated by an Armenian terrorist. 
21 March – Aşık Veysel, folk poet
21 April – Kemal Tahir, novelist
13 October – Cevat Şakir Kabaağaçlı (pen name Halikarnas Balıkçısı), novelist
8 November – Faruk Nafiz Çamlıbel, poet.
25 December – İsmet İnönü, second president of Turkey

Gallery

See also
 1972–73 1.Lig
 List of Turkish films of 1973

References

 
Years of the 20th century in Turkey
1973 in Europe
1973 in Asia
Turkey